The 2010 Idaho Secretary of State election was held on November 2, 2010, to elect the Secretary of State of Idaho. Incumbent Republican Secretary of State Ben Ysursa won the election for a third term.

Republican Primary

Democratic Primary

General Election

References

2010 Idaho elections
Idaho Secretary of State elections
Idaho
November 2010 events in the United States